The Croatia national beach handball team is the national team of Croatia. It is governed by the Croatian Handball Federation and takes part in international beach handball competitions.

It was the first Croatian national team to win a gold medal at the World Games.

Results

World Championships

World Games

* invitational sport

World Beach Games

European Championships

Medalist teams
 World Championships 2022:
Dominik Marković, Borna Kolić, Ivan Dumenčić, Ivan Jurić, Filip Goričanec, Lucian Bura, Josip Dukeš, Valentino Valentaković, Josip Leko, Nikola Finek. 
Coach: Mladen Paradžik

Awards
 Best goalkeeper of the tournament: Igor Totić (2012 WC, 2014 WC), Dominik Marković (2022 WG)
 Best right wing of the tournament: Lucian Bura (2018 WC, 2022 WG, 2022 WC)
 Best left wing of the tournament: Ivan Jurić (2016 WC, 2018 WC)
 MVP of the tournament: Ivan Jurić (2016 WC), Lucian Bura (2022 WC)

Abbreviations: WG − World Games · WC − World Championship

Record against other teams
As of 16 July 2022, after 2022 WG

See also
Croatia women's national beach handball team

References

External links
Official website
IHF profile

Beach handball
National beach handball teams
National sports teams of Croatia